Zoltán Tóth may refer to:

Zoltán Tóth (figure skater) (born 1979), Hungarian figure skater at two Winter Olympics
Zoltán Tóth (footballer, born 1955)
Zoltán Tóth (footballer, born 1983)